Graham Peak is a prominent mountain summit in the San Juan Mountains , a range of the Rocky Mountains System in southwestern Colorado  

See also
List of the most prominent summits of Colorado
List of Colorado county high points
List of Colorado mountain ranges
List of Colorado mountain summits

References

External links

Mountains of Hinsdale County, Colorado
San Juan Mountains (Colorado)
San Juan National Forest
North American 3000 m summits
Mountains of Colorado